Storheddernuten or Storhidlernuten (historic: Storhellernuten) is a mountain on the border of Agder and Rogaland counties in southern Norway. The mountain sits on the border of the municipalities of Suldal in Rogaland and Bykle in Agder. The mountain is the 21st highest mountain in Agder county.

The mountain sits near the northernmost point in Agder county, just south of the lake Holmavatnet. The mountain Skyvassnuten and the lake Skyvatn lie just a few kilometers south of this mountain.

See also
List of mountains of Norway

References

Bykle
Suldal
Mountains of Rogaland
Mountains of Agder